Mirza Zain Baig (Urdu: مرزا زین بیگ; born 12 January 1990) is a Pakistani actor and model. In 2016 he made his debut in Dil Lagi as Fazal. Baig rose to fame after portraying Malik Balaj, a cruel, feudal person in Malaal-e-Yaar.

In 2022, he was seen, playing the role of Aziz, in the drama Pehchaan which aired on Hum TV.

Personal life

Baig was born in Karachi on 12 January 1990. He has two older twin sisters and one younger sister. In an interview with Fuchsia, Baig revealed that he attended St. Jude’s School.

After completing his studies, Baig travelled to London, where he studied Chartered Accountancy, for three years before returning to Pakistan.

Baig, in an interview, revealed that he is “happily married”.

Career

Baig, whenever he went grocery shopping, often got asked to model, but always declined until his mother convinced him to have a go. Baig found that he enjoyed modelling so “decided to continue this profession”. He has walked for many lead fashion designers, like Umar Sayeed, and has taken part in many bridal shows and fashion events.

In 2016 Baig made his tv debut in the drama, Dil Lagi after director Nadeem Baig offered him a role. In the same year Baig was seen in Laaj as Shahzeb, and Faraz in Kuch Na Kaho.

In 2017 Baig portrayed the character, Ali, in Hum TV’s drama Mohabbat Khawab Safar, and Javeed in Bedardi Saiyaan on Geo Entertainment. Baig made a guest appearance in Sammi as Pervaiz.

In 2018, Baig was seen in two Pakistani dramas, Aik Mohabbat Kafi Hai, which aired on BOL Network, and Naulakha, which aired on TV One Pakistan.

In 2019, Baig was seen in Aas as Safeer, Mera Rab Waris as Faizi, Dil Kiya Karay as Saadi Raza, Meer Abru as Saim, Dil-e-Gumshuda as Nadeem and Malaal-e-Yaar as Malik Balaj, for which he rose prominent for.

In 2020, Baig was cast as Arbaaz alongside Saboor Aly, Zubab Rana and Ali Abbas in the drama, Fitrat. In the same year he starred in Tera Ghum Aur Hum as Ali alongside Azekah Daniel in their second project together.

In 2021, Baig starred as Azar in Hum TV’s drama, Yaar Na Bichray alongside Zainab Shabbir in their second project together. He also played Taimoor Shah in, Pakistan’s most watched drama,Khuda Aur Muhabbat, and Murtaza in Bisaat starring Ayesha Omar and Azfar Rehman.

In 2022, Baig played Hamza in the anthology series, Sirat-e-Mustaqeem opposite Hina Altaf, which was a Ramadan special broadcast on ARY Digital. He then portrayed the  character of Aziz in the drama Pehchaan alongside Hiba Bukhari and Syed Jibran on Hum TV. Baig also starred, as Azhar Baig, in the short YouTube film, Truth or Dare, on SeePrime.

Filmography

Films

Television

Other Appearances

References

External links
 

Pakistani television actors
1990 births
Living people